Zarkesh or Zar Gesh or Zarkish may refer to:
Zarkesh, Razavi Khorasan
 Zarkesh, South Khorasan
Zarkesh, Tehran Province